"AP" is a song by American rapper Pop Smoke. It was released on February 26, 2021, through Victor Victor Worldwide and Republic Records. It is the lead single from the Boogie soundtrack, in which Pop Smoke stars.

Background and release
The song first originated as a collaboration with Rich the Kid, who previewed the song in April 2020 when it was called "Nikes". On February 25, 2021, Victor Victor Worldwide and Republic Records announced the song would be the lead single from the Boogie soundtrack. It was released on February 26, 2021.

Music and lyrics
Musically, "AP" is a drill track. Aleia Woods from XXL stated that the track consists of "Pop Smoke's signature grit and growl over a grim and bass-heavy beat". Wongo Okon of Uproxx wrote Pop Smoke "flaunts his lavish lifestyle and raps about his jewelry, money, and more". Pop Smoke raps on the hook: "AP, Spicy/I bust a check in my Nikes. Am I a killa? Might be/Two tone, icy."

Promotion
The lyric video for "AP" shows footage from the movie of Pop Smoke as well as behind-the-scenes photos.

Critical reception
Zoe Haylock of Vulture described the song as an "intimidating anthem".

Credits and personnel
Credits adapted from Tidal.

Pop Smoke vocals, songwriter
808Melo production, programming, songwriter
Rico Beats production, programming, vocal programming, songwriter
Steven Victor songwriter
Jaycen Joshua mastering engineer, mixing engineer

Charts

References 

2020 songs
2021 singles
Pop Smoke songs
Republic Records singles
Songs released posthumously
Songs written by 808Melo
Songs written by Pop Smoke
Songs written for films